Charli Turner Thorne (born March 10, 1966) is a former head coach for the Arizona State Sun Devils women's basketball team. She has coached for 28 seasons from 1993 to 2022.

Biography 
Turner Thorne studied psychology at Stanford University, where she played basketball under Tara VanDerveer.  She graduated in 1988 with a bachelor's degree and later studied for a master's degree in education at the University of Washington, graduating in 1990.  She is married to Will Thorne and they have three children, Conor, Liam, and Quinn.

Coaching career 
Turner Thorne began her coaching career as a graduate assistant at Washington in 1988, then an assistant coach at Santa Clara in 1990. In 1993, Turner Thorne became head coach at Northern Arizona, winning consecutive seasons in 1994-95 and 1995–96, the first time the school had accomplished this. In 1996, she moved over to become the head coach at Arizona State University.  Turner Thorne has led the Arizona State women's basketball team to the NCAA Tournament 14 times.

In the 2000-01 season, the Sun Devils under Turner Thorne achieved a 20-11 overall record and its first NCAA appearance in 22 years.  In the 2001-2002 season, the team achieved a record of 25-9, which matched the single-season school record for most wins at that time.  ASU shared the Pac-10 title in 2001 and the inaugural Pac-10 Tournament title in 2002, the first league championships the school had achieved.

In the 2006-07 season, the Sun Devils won 31 games, including a school record 16 Pac-10 wins, which brought them to the Elite Eight of the NCAA Tournament for the first time.  At the end of the 2006-07 season, the Sun Devils ranked No. 8 in the final USA Today/ESPN coaches poll and No. 10 in the final Associated Press poll, the highest final rankings in each poll that the school had ever achieved.  In the summer of 2007 Turner Thorne served as an assistant coach on USA Basketball's U-21 World Championship Team which won the gold medal at the U-21 FIBA World Championship in Moscow, Russia.

In 2009 the Sun Devils made the Elite Eight of the NCAA Tournament for the second time in three seasons under Turner Thorne's leadership.  Having achieved 26 wins in the 2008-09 season, Turner Thorne became one of three Pac-10 coaches alongside University of Washington head coach Chris Gobrecht and Stanford University head coach Tara VanDerveer to have led their respective schools to five or more consecutive 20-win seasons.

During the summer of 2009, Turner Thorne served as the head coach for the USA Women's World University Games Team which won the gold medal at the 2009 World University Games in Belgrade, Serbia, having won all seven of their games. It was Turner Thorne's second time working with USA Basketball.

In July 2009, Turner Thorne became vice president of the Women's Basketball Coaches Association's (WBCA) Executive Committee.

For the 2011–12 basketball season, Turner Thorne took a leave of absence from her coaching duties and returned for the 2012–13 season.
On March 3, 2022, Turner Thorne announced her coaching retirement.

Year-by-year results

References 

1966 births
Living people
American women's basketball coaches
American women's basketball players
Arizona State Sun Devils women's basketball coaches
Northern Arizona Lumberjacks women's basketball coaches
Santa Clara Broncos women's basketball coaches
Stanford Cardinal women's basketball players
University of Washington College of Education alumni
Washington Huskies women's basketball coaches
Guards (basketball)